Barry Lake is a body of freshwater in the north-eastern part of Senneterre in the La Vallée-de-l'Or Regional County Municipality (RCM), in the administrative region of Abitibi-Témiscamingue, in the province of Quebec, in Canada. 

Barry Lake is the head of the Saint-Cyr River South (slope of Mégiscane River) flowing south, and also the head of the Saint-Cyr River (slope of the Opawica River) flowing towards the North.

Barry Lake straddles the townships of Barry and Bailly. Forestry is the main economic activity of the sector. Recreational tourism activities come second.

The lake Barry watershed is accessible via a forest road (North-South direction) on the east side of the Saint-Cyr River Valley; in addition, another forest road (East-West direction) serves the northern part of the [Barry Lake Biodiversity Reserve] and connects the R1015 road west.

The surface of Barry Lake is usually frozen from early November to mid-May, however, safe ice movement is generally from mid-November to mid-April.

Geography

Toponymy
Formerly, this body of water was designated "Lake Matciskan".

The toponym "Lac Canusio" was formalized on December 5, 1968, by the Commission de toponymie du Québec, when it was created.

Notes and references

See also 

Lakes of Abitibi-Témiscamingue
Nottaway River drainage basin